Niel Gow (1727 – 1 March 1807) was the most famous Scottish fiddler of the eighteenth century.

Early life 

Gow was born in Strathbraan, Perthshire, in 1727, as the son of John Gow and Catherine McEwan. The family moved to Inver in Perthshire when Niel was an infant. He started playing the fiddle when very young and at age 13 received his first formal lessons from one John Cameron. 

In spite of being something of a musical prodigy, he originally trained as a weaver, but eventually gave up that trade to become a full-time musician. He was widely considered the best fiddle player in Perthshire, an area which was renowned for its musicians—the story goes that at age 18 he entered a competition that was being judged by John McCraw, a blind musician, who awarded him the first prize and then went on to claim that he "would ken his bow hand among a hunder[d] players" (detect Niel's style among a hundred players). This attracted the attention of the Duke of Atholl, who became Niel's patron, and also ensured Niel's employment for balls and dance parties put on by the local nobility. In time he became renowned as a fiddler.

Musical career  

According to John Glen (1895), Niel Gow composed, or is credited with composing eighty-seven dance tunes, "some of which are excellent." These tunes form the backstay of Scottish country dance music even today. However, it must be said that he was not above claiming good material from other composers as his own; Glen claims that at least a quarter of the eighty-seven tunes are either derived from older tunes or are copies of tunes published earlier elsewhere, often under a different title. The Biographical Dictionary of Eminent Scotsmen indicates that Gow's air of Locherroch Side was the basis for Robert Burns' ballad, "Oh! stay, sweet warbling Woodlark, stay."  This "borrowing" was a common practice at the time and it did not seem to hurt his reputation; Henry Raeburn was commissioned to paint him several times.

Many of Niel Gow's compositions are still played today at ceilidhs and country dances. He himself spelled his name Niel, although others sometimes spell it Neil or even Neal. The National Records of Scotland attest that Gow himself used the name 'Neil'. To add to the confusion he had a musical grandson (by Nathaniel) who did spell his name "Neil".

The annual Niel Gow Fiddle Festival takes place in Dunkeld and Birnam, Perthshire, Scotland.  It was established in 2004 to celebrate the life and music of Gow, including a fund raising campaign to erect a fitting memorial to him in Dunkeld and Birnam.

Later life  

Niel Gow was married twice. His first wife was Margaret Wiseman, and they had five sons and three daughters. His sons William, Andrew (1760), Nathaniel (1763), and John (1764) all followed their father as fiddlers and composers of fiddle music; two of the daughters were Margaret (1759) and Grizel (1761).  The youngest son, Daniel (1765), died in infancy; William died in 1791 at age 40, and Andrew died in 1794 at 34. Of Niel's sons, Nathaniel is by far the most well-known and another fine composer of Scottish music, with nearly two hundred tunes to his credit. 

As a widower, Gow married Margaret Urquhart from Perth in 1768, and they went on to share a happy marriage until she died in 1805, which prompted his composition of one of his most famous tunes: "Niel Gow's Lament for the Death of his Second Wife". 

Gow died at Inver on 1 March 1807, aged 80.

Following on from the efforts of the fund-raising campaign, a memorial statue of Gow was commissioned with David Annand as sculptor. It was finally erected and unveiled in December 2020.

The 20th Century English composer David Gow is a descendent. He commemorated the connection in his Six Diversions on an Ancestral Theme.

Contributions

Compositions 

Admiral Nelson 
Niel Gow's Lament For the Death of His Second Wife 
Dunkeld Bridge
Farewell to Whisky
The Stool of Repentance
The Duchess of Athole’s Skipper
The Athole Volunteers March
 Miss Stewart of Grantully
Highland Whisky
Niel Gow’s Lamentation for James Moray, Esq., of Abercarney
Major Graham of Inchbrakie
Lady Ann Hope’s Favourite

Recordings 

Quadriga Consort CD "By Yon Bonnie Banks" ORF Early Music Edition, Vienna 2007
Scotland's Pete Clark: In the Footsteps of Niel Gow
Even Now, The Music of Niel Gow by Pete Clark, Smiddymade, 1998
Niel Gow’s Fiddle by Pete Clark & Muriel Johnstone, Inver 229, 2017

See also

 Scottish Baroque music
 Niel Gow's Oak

References

The Glen Collection of Scottish Dance Music, republished by the Highland Music Trust, 2001.
Clark, Pete. Even Now: The Music of Niel Gow. Smiddymade Recordings, Perthshire, Scotland, 1999 (SMD615). CD album with extensive album notes. Fifteen tunes by Niel Gow played by Pete Clark on Niel Gow's own fiddle and recorded in the ballroom of Blair Castle, a frequent eighteenth-century Niel Gow venue. (The Raeburn portrait above, posted by the author of this article, is part of the Blair Castle Collection.)
The Fiddle Music of Scotland  by James Hunter. Edited by Alastair Hardie and William Hardie published by The Hardie Press, 1988.
Scottish Fiddle Music in the Eighteenth Century; A Music Collection and Historical Study  By David Johnson publishes by Mercat Press, 1984.

External links

Folk Music Net Biography of Niel Gow
Dunkeld Cathedral Biography of Niel Gow
Niel Gow Fiddle Festival
Free PDF of 90 of Niel Gow's tunes

Scottish fiddlers
British male violinists
Scottish folk musicians
Scottish composers
1727 births
1807 deaths
People from Perthshire
18th-century Scottish people
19th-century Scottish people
Paintings by Henry Raeburn
19th-century Scottish musicians
18th-century Scottish musicians
19th-century British male musicians